Quasius Quarry is a historic site near the Sheboygan River in Rhine, Wisconsin. It is listed on the National Register of Historic Places as the Sheboygan Valley Land and Lime Company. It includes a limestone quarry and kilns for producing quicklime, constructed in 1911 and abandoned in the 1920s.

See also

National Register of Historic Places listings in Sheboygan County, Wisconsin

References

Quarries in the United States
Lime kilns in the United States
National Register of Historic Places in Sheboygan County, Wisconsin
Tourist attractions in Sheboygan County, Wisconsin